Teacher's Pests is a 1932 short animated film featuring Oswald the Lucky Rabbit. It is the 66th Oswald short by Walter Lantz Productions, and the 118th in the entire series.

Plot
A female buffalo who is a school teacher is attending a class. While she conducts as most of the students are singing, the boy beagle (making his debut in this film) blows his nose, much to her disturbance. When the buffalo tells the boy beagle to approach, another student puts a balloon under his very long shirt. And as she strikes the little dog in the rear with a rod, the balloon bursts, creating a loud noise. The buffalo then tells the boy beagle to just stand next to the extra chalk board.

The buffalo then draws some numbers on the main chalk board. She then calls Oswald to do something creative with them. Oswald takes out a music box which plays the song Raggamuffin Romeo. Surprisingly, the numbers on the board dance to his music.

At the extra chalk board, the boy beagle attempts to win the buffalo's forgiveness as he writes words of praise for her. After getting a little appreciation from her, he attempts to get more as he replaces some of the words with the teacher's face. The buffalo, however, misinterprets the act for something insulting, and therefore tells the boy beagle to stand on a tall stool.

On one of the class chairs, a bear is sleeping, and the buffalo is seemingly bothered by this. The buffalo then sends a balloon carrying a cinderblock which subsequently drops on the bear. The bear is awaken, and a hound from behind laughs at the incident. The bear responds by punching the hound. The hound tries to retaliate by hurling a book, only to miss and hit Oswald instead. Oswald is sent in front, finding his head in a bin. The buffalo confronts Oswald for some reason. The buffalo and Oswald engaged in a stick fight, resulting in the rabbit winning and pushing the teacher further in the background. A tabby comes forward, tossing chalk sticks around. The boy beagle jumps off the stool, and kicks the buffalo out of a window where she crashes onto a cake seller who drops some of the deserts.

Having enough of the students' unruly antics, the buffalo dismisses the class. But as the students come out, the buffalo picks up and tosses the cakes at them. Oswald and the boy beagle, however, are able to dodge the scheming teacher's projectiles. When the buffalo tosses one more cake, Oswald uses a U-shaped tube to send it back. The buffalo is knocked down and covered in a gooey mess. The film ends with Oswald and the boy beagle laughing.

References

External links
Teacher's Pests at the Big Cartoon Database

1932 films
1932 animated films
1930s American animated films
1930s animated short films
American black-and-white films
Films directed by Walter Lantz
Oswald the Lucky Rabbit cartoons
Universal Pictures short films
Walter Lantz Productions shorts
Films set in schools
Universal Pictures animated short films
Animated films about animals